Graphium biokoensis, the Gauthier's striped swordtail, is a butterfly in the family Papilionidae (swallowtails). It is found in eastern Nigeria, Equatorial Guinea, Bioko, Cameroon, Gabon, the Republic of the Congo, the eastern part of the Democratic Republic of the Congo and Burundi. Its habitat consists of forests.
 
It closely resembles Graphium liponesco but is slightly larger and the light grey scales at base of space 2 are absent.

Taxonomy
It is a member of the Graphium policenes-clade (policenes, Graphium liponesco, Graphium biokoensis, Graphium policenoides, Graphium porthaon.)

References

Bioko
Butterflies of Africa
Butterflies described in 1984